Dario David Cioni (born 2 December 1974) is a retired English-born Italian professional road bicycle racer.

Career

Mountain bike career
Cioni began his career as a professional mountain bike racer at the age of 19. He found success early with victory in the Italian Winter Championship and second place at both the Italian Cup and Italian Championships. Selected to represent Italy at the World Championships, Cioni finished tenth. He continued with similar results through his mountain bike career, with several top five placings at World Cup events including second at St. Wendel in 1996. Cioni also rode some Cyclo-cross towards the end of the nineties.

Road racing career
In 2000, Cioni was selected for the  team, alongside, amongst others, Filippo Pozzato, Fabian Cancellara, Michael Rogers and Charlie Wegelius. His intention was to use the training on the road to help his mountain bike career with the specific aim of riding for Italy at the 2000 Summer Olympics. However, he was not selected for the Olympics and it was at this point that Cioni decided to concentrate on road racing. In his first season, Cioni won a stage of the Tour of Slovenia and was second in a stage of the Tour de Normandie. He also rode his first Vuelta a España. In 2001, Cioni won his first stage race, the Vuelta Minho in Portugal. Whilst Petacchi flourished that season, Cioni had no notable results.

It was in 2004 that Cioni made his breakthrough in sustaining his abilities in time trialing and climbing through important stage races. After a promising Tour de Romandie, where he finished fifth overall, Cioni finished fourth in the Giro d'Italia and followed this up with third place in the Tour de Suisse. Cioni was subsequently chosen to represent Italy at the World Cycling Championships, however, was not allowed to complete when he registered a hematocrit level over 50%. Although Cioni was aware his hematocrit level was naturally high, he had failed to get an exemption and personal level from the Italian federation in 1999, since his level was not consistently higher than 50%, but consistently around it. The UCI awarded Cioni an exemption certificate, with a personal level, after further tests in October 2004. In 2005, Cioni moved to the newly formed  team where, despite being one of the team's leaders and hence liberated from the role of domestique, he had no notable successes. The best that Cioni achieved at Liquigas was a second place in stage four in the 2005 Giro d'Italia, third place at the 2005 Italian National time trial championships and sixth place overall at the 2006 Tour de Romandie. In 2007, Cioni moved to the Belgian ProTour team . His first victory with this team came when he won the first stage of that year's Vuelta a Andalucía, outsprinting his breakaway companion Antón Luengo.

In 2011 he announced his retirement from racing, and moved into a public relations role with his final pro team, . He was also appointed as a member of the inaugural UCI Athletes' Commission in 2011. He originally served as a business manager with the team, combining the role with work as a press officer. He switched roles and became one of the team's directeurs sportifs in 2014.

Personal life
He currently lives in Montelupo Fiorentino, Tuscany, with his wife. In 2004, Cioni graduated from the European School of Economics with an honours degree in International Business with specialisation in Sports Management.

Major results

2004
 1st  National Time Trial Champion
 3rd Overall Tour de Suisse
 4th Overall Giro d'Italia
 5th Overall Tour de Romandie
2005
 13th Overall Giro d'Italia
2006
 6th Overall Tour de Romandie
2007
 1st Stage 1 part b TTT Settimana Ciclistica Internazionale Coppi-Bartali
 2nd Overall Vuelta a Andalucía
1st Stage 1
2008
 2nd Firenze Pistoia
2009
 1st Stage 1 part b TTT Settimana Ciclistica Internazionale Coppi-Bartali
 3rd Firenze Pistoia
 4th Overall Tour of Slovenia
 4th Overall Vuelta Chihuahua International
2011
 7th Overall, Vuelta a Castilla y León

References

External links

Italian male cyclists
Italian British sportspeople
Sportspeople from Reading, Berkshire
1974 births
British emigrants to Italy
Living people
Doping cases in cycling
Italian mountain bikers
Directeur sportifs